JACK FM is an adult hits format radio station that broadcasts on 106.8 MHz FM in Oxford, Oxfordshire, United Kingdom, and on DAB in Oxfordshire.  Between 2016 and 2017 it also broadcast in Surrey and parts of Hampshire. The station shares premises in Eynsham, Oxfordshire, with its sister stations JACK 2 and JACK 3.

As of December 2022, the station broadcasts to a weekly audience of 39,000, according to RAJAR.

History
In October 2006, ARI Consultancy, who had acquired Passion 107.9 from the Milestone Group, announced plans to launch the UK's first Jack FM format station after winning a broadcast licence for the Oxford area. 106 Jack FM Oxford started broadcasting at 1:06 PM BST on October 18, 2007.

Information
The station is owned by Jack Media Oxfordshire Ltd.  The radio station is the most awarded Local Radio Station in the United Kingdom, having secured 23 industry award wins in just 5 years on air . The breadth of awards won by the station range from Imaging right through to news, programming and the most coveted Station of the Year awards.

Based on the format of the American station of the same name, JACKfm runs with a strapline of "Playing What We Want" and mostly has no DJs across daytimes (and even nighttimes). The music is played out on an automated system interspersed with witty soundbites voiced by comedian and writer Dom Joly, referred to as The Voice of JACK. Joly took over as The Voice of JACK on 4 July 2022, replacing the previous Voice of JACK Paul Darrow who held the role since the station's launch in 2007.  Darrow, best known for his role in the BBC's Blake's 7, died in 2019, which left the station without any topical soundbites, but his more generic announcements continued to be used until July 2022. Following Darrow's death in June 2019, Oxford born Jim Rosenthal was introduced as an additional voice to commentate on current affairs. Darrow's soundbites continue to be used on sister station JACK 3 & Chill.

In 2010, JACK FM became the first radio station in the United Kingdom (except for Forces Radio BFBS) to broadcast live from Afghanistan for a week-long series of breakfast broadcasts in conjunction with the M.O.D from Camp Bastion in Afghanistan. The station returned to Bastion and Kandahar again in 2012 for another series of broadcasts and Father's Day special.

 

The radio station runs live local news every hour from 6am till 7pm weekdays (every half-hour from 6am to 9am and 4pm to 7pm), and from 9am till 1pm on weekends with live traffic reports from 6am till 7pm.

Sister stations
JACK FM has developed a number of sister stations.

 JACK 2, branded as JACK 2 Hits, was launched in 2013 and was previously known under a variety of names since its original launch in 1997.  It broadcasts on DAB in Oxfordshire and previously on DAB in Surrey and Hampshire.
 JACK 3 branded as JACK 3 & Chill, is an easy listening station which launched on DAB in Oxfordshire in May 2017.  A national variant launched on DAB+ on the Sound Digital multiplex in April 2018 and was replaced by JACK Radio in October. The national and Oxford versions of JACK 3 were two separate streams, and the Oxfordshire version remains available.  In April 2020 it replaced JACK 2 on 107.9 MHz in Oxfordshire following a request to Ofcom, although this is due to be reverted in early 2023.

Former stations 

 Union JACK was a national station broadcasting online, and previously on DAB+ on the Sound Digital multiplex until February 2022, playing music from British artists.  It launched on 9 September 2016.  Union JACK was a music-heavy station with British-only songs and artists completely chosen by listeners in a JACK 2-like format and interspersed with classic and commissioned comedy clips, mainly impressions done by Josh Berry. The station also featured a weekly programme dedicated to new music titled 'Underdogs', presented by 'Lucy Leeds'.  The station, along with JACK 3 and Union JACK, featured voiceovers from Paul Darrow and Jim Rosenthal.  In December 2020, two spin-off stations were launched to complement the station, Union JACK Rock, playing only British rock tracks, and Union JACK Dance, playing only British Dance and Upbeat tracks.
 JACK Radio ran from 23 October 2018 until 10 December 2020 on the Sound Digital national multiplex, taking the place of the national version of JACK 3. JACK Radio played music performed by female and female-fronted acts, including classic and contemporary hits, and female artists' covers of tracks originally recorded by male performers.

Administration of National Services
In February 2022 the Union JACK stations ceased broadcasting on DAB and it was later confirmed they had been put into administration. Adam English was made redundant. The stations finally ceased broadcasting on or around 18 March 2022.

Ali Booker
In 2009, JACK FM News presenter Ali Booker, who previously worked for BBC Radio Oxford, began documenting her life with cancer via audio diaries which were broadcast on Jack FM. In May 2010 Ali was awarded the Silver Sony award. A few weeks later the diaries also won Ali commercial radio’s top award – a Radio Academy Gold Arqiva. Ali's diaries were featured in The Sunday Times on 27 June 2010 and The Independent on 1 July 2010. MP Ed Vaizey also paid tribute to Ali in the House of Commons. Ali died on 1 July 2010 from breast cancer.

See also
Jack FM
Adult hits

References

External links
JACK fm (Oxfordshire)
JACK 2 Hits (Oxfordshire)
JACK 3 & Chill (Oxfordshire)
Official website of Union JACK
Transmitter information

Radio stations in Oxfordshire
Oxfordshire